Dmitri Semin (born August 14, 1983) is a Russian professional ice hockey centre who is currently an unrestricted free agent. He most recently played for Torpedo Nizhny Novgorod of the Kontinental Hockey League (KHL). He was selected by the St. Louis Blues in the 5th round (159th overall) of the 2001 NHL Entry Draft.

Career statistics

Regular season and playoffs

International

References

External links

1983 births
Living people
Atlant Moscow Oblast players
Avangard Omsk players
Lokomotiv Yaroslavl players
Ice hockey people from Moscow
Russian ice hockey centres
St. Louis Blues draft picks
Salavat Yulaev Ufa players
HC Spartak Moscow players
Torpedo Nizhny Novgorod players
HC Vityaz players